Little River, Alabama may refer to the following places in Alabama:
Little River, Baldwin County, Alabama
Little River, Cherokee County, Alabama